Ishan Pandita (born 26 May 1998) is an Indian professional footballer who plays as a striker for Indian Super League club Jamshedpur and the India national team.

Club career

Early and youth career
Pandita left India and arrived in the Philippines, where he attended British school in Manila and first took football training. He returned to Bengaluru at the age of eleven, and then appeared with Student Unions and Bangalore Yellows. He soon gained recognition in BDCA Division A and C state soccer leagues. IF Brommapojkarna spotted Pandita and included in their U17 side after his brilliant performance at the 2013 Gothia Cup in Sweden.

Pandita arrived in Spain in 2014 at the age of 16 and joined Alcobendas Juvenil. In 2015, he joined the Under-18 team of La Liga club Almería but he did not sign a professional contract as he had not turned 18 that time.  In the 2016, he joined the U-19 team of Leganés. He was the first ever Indian footballer to play for a Juvenil side of a Spanish top division club. After a spell at Leganes, he signed a short-term contract with the U-23 team of Gimnàstic on 5 January 2019.

Pobla Mafumet
Ishan signed his first senior contract for the farm club of Gimnàstic, Pobla Mafumet in early 2019. He played only one match for the club throughout his debut season and left the club.

Lorca
In August 2019, he signed a one-year deal with Tercera Division Club Lorca. He played 26 matches and scored 6 goals and was the top scorer for the club in the 2019–20 season.

Goa
Initially he and his family wanted to stay in Spain, but due to the COVID-19 situation it was difficult to find a club for him. In early 2020, rumours spread about Pandita's return to India and it was speculated that he might sign for Goa. In October 2020, the club revealed that it had secured Pandita in their squad. He made his debut for FC Goa on 30 November 2020 against NorthEast United at 89th minute of that match as a substitute. He scored his debut goal for FC Goa against Hyderabad on 30 December 2020. He came as a substitute on 86th minute and scored with his first touch on the 87th minute as FC Goa equalised the game.

He has also represented FC Goa at the 2021 AFC Champions League, in which they achieved third place in group stages.

Jamshedpur
On 2 September 2021, it was announced that Pandita was signed by Jamshedpur on a two-year deal for a fee reported around 6 Million, ahead of the 2021–22 Indian Super League season. He scored his first goal for the club in their 3–2 win against NorthEast United on 6 January 2022.

International career
Pandita's performances in his debut season in the ISL were noticed, and subsequently he earned a call-up to the India national team in March 2021, ahead of India's friendlies against Oman and UAE. On 25 March, he made his debut in 1–1 draw against Oman. Ishan scored for India during practice game I-League All-Stars on 18 May 2022. He scored his first international goal on 14 June against Hong Kong in their 4–0 win at the 2023 AFC Asian Cup qualification.

In September, he participated at the 2022 VFF Tri-Nations Series in Vietnam, where India finished as runners-up.

Personal life 
Though he was born in New Delhi, Pandita is of Kashmiri descent as his family hails from Kashmir. He then moved to Bengaluru, but stayed there not longer and moved to Spain as he desired to play better football there. After spending a term of six years in various lower division Spanish clubs, he returned to India and signed for Goa.

Career statistics

Club

International

International goals
Scores and results list India's goal tally first

Honours

Jamshedpur
Indian Super League; League Winners Shield: 2021–22

See also
 List of Indian football players in foreign leagues

References

External links 

 
 Ishan Pandita at Indian Super League

Living people
1998 births
Indian footballers
Footballers from Delhi
Association football forwards
India international footballers
CF Pobla de Mafumet footballers
Tercera División players
Indian Super League players
Lorca FC players
FC Goa players
Jamshedpur FC players
Indian expatriate footballers
Indian expatriates in Spain
Expatriate footballers in Spain